John Giordano may refer to:

 John Giordano (conductor) (born 1937), American conductor, professor of music, composer, and former concert saxophonist
 John Giordano (ice hockey coach), former ice hockey coach
 John Giordano (martial artist), martial artist and practices alternative medicine